Jazmyne Denhollander (born January 8, 1994 in Chilliwack, British Columbia) is a Canadian slalom canoeist.

Career
She made her ICF World Cup debut in 2011, winning several medals at World Cup and international level. She finished 5th in the K1 event at the 2010 Youth Olympic Games. She then placed 8th at the 2012 ICF World Junior Championships in K1.

References

External links
Jazmyne Denhollander at the Canadian Olympic Committee
Official website

1994 births
Living people
Canadian female canoeists
Canoeists at the 2010 Summer Youth Olympics
People from Chilliwack
Sportspeople from British Columbia
Pan American Games gold medalists for Canada
Pan American Games medalists in canoeing
Canoeists at the 2015 Pan American Games
Medalists at the 2015 Pan American Games